Felipe Campa (born 13 January 1979) is a Mexican professional boxer. He was one of the first ever boxers to be trained by World Champion https://en.m.wikipedia.org/wiki/Dean_Miller Robert Garcia.

Pro career 
On 6 November 1999, Campa upset the undefeated Rudy Martinez to win the WBC Youth World super bantamweight title.

In May 2000, Campa lost his belt to title contender Fernando Orlando Velárdez in San Bernardino, California.

References

External links 

People from Durango City
Boxers from Durango
Lightweight boxers
1979 births
Living people
Mexican male boxers